John Westly Kibble (January 2, 1892 – December 13, 1969) nicknamed  "Happy", was a Major League Baseball player for the Cleveland Naps in . He played five games (four at third base), going 0-for-8 at the plate. His only time on base was a hit by pitch.

Sources

Major League Baseball third basemen
Cleveland Naps players
Helena Senators players
Portland Colts players
Portland Beavers players
Evansville River Rats players
New Orleans Pelicans (baseball) players
Evansville Evas players
Portland Buckaroos (baseball) players
Bloomington Bloomers players
Baseball players from Illinois
1892 births
1969 deaths